Kenyon Rasheed is a former National Football League running back for the New York Giants.

Kenyon was born August 23, 1970 in Kansas City, Missouri.  After graduating Rockhurst High School in Kansas City, Missouri, he attended the University of Oklahoma, where he played football for four years.  As a Sooner, he served as the captain of the team, and also was named to the All-Big 8 academic team four years straight.  At 5'10" and 245 pounds, Kenyon was drafted to the New York Giants, where he played for four years from 1993 to 1996.

Beyond football
He is now the CEO of Rasheed & Associates.

References

1970 births
Living people
American football running backs
New York Giants players
Oklahoma Sooners football players